This is the discography of the British electronica/rock band, Alabama 3.
The band was founded by The Very Reverend Dr. D.Wayne Love (Jake Black) and Larry Love (Rob Spragg), and consists of twelve studio albums, fourteen singles and two solo efforts from band members.
Alabama 3 are best known for "Woke Up This Morning" which was chosen as the opening theme to the HBO hit TV series, The Sopranos. They have also covered songs by Bruce Springsteen, The Eagles and John Prine.

Albums

Studio albums

Compilation albums

Soundtrack albums

Singles

Solo albums

Other releases 
 Converted Pt.1 (1998) (Import)
 Woke up this Morning (2000) (Import)
 Sad Eyed Lady/A3 Remixes (2001)
 Mansion on the Hill (2001) (Import)
 Ya Basta! - Live in Italy (2001) (bootleg)
 Zero Tolerance (2001) (bootleg)
 Transfusion: Power in the Blood Remixes (2002) (tour only)
 Live in Dublin (2002) (tour only)
 Last Train to Mashville, vol.1 (2004) (tour only)
 Live at Glastonbury 2005 (2006) (tour only)
 Outlaw Remixes (2006) (tour only)
 12 Step Plan - Unofficial Release (2010)

Music videos

References

Discographies of British artists